Trachysomus verrucosus is a species of beetle in the family Cerambycidae from French Guiana, Brazil, and Panama. It was described by Olivier in 1797.

References

Onciderini
Beetles described in 1797